West Campus High School is a public college preparatory magnet high school in Sacramento, California. The school serves around 800 students in grades 9–12 in the Sacramento City Unified School District. It was founded as a satellite high school of the nearby Hiram W. Johnson High School in 1983, under the name Hiram Johnson West Campus, and separated from Hiram Johnson in the year 2000. The high school officially opened on September 3, 2001. West Campus is known for sending the most graduates to college, and has been recognized for doing so by the Sacramento Bee in 2019.

Academics 
West Campus offers a total of 14 AP (Advanced Placement) courses currently including AP Government, AP Biology, AP US History, AP Art, AP Calculus AB, AP Calculus BC, AP Statistics, AP Spanish, AP French and more. Currently, West Campus offers 2 honors classes, Honors Chemistry and Honors English 10. Elective courses include Advanced Art, Yearbook, Band, and Engineering. West Campus provides courses that align with the "A-G requirements", which are mandatory for each student in order to graduate.

Ranking
In 2020 U.S. News evaluated West Campus at 99.08%, ranking it 164 in the nation (out of 17,792 ranked high schools), 19 in California, and 1 in the Sacramento Metro Area.

Standardized Testing
West Campus offers free SAT, PSAT, and AP exams to its students. West Campus also places in the top 25% of all California high-schools in terms of standardized testing scores.

Engineering Program
West Campus is known for its 4-year engineering program, which is guided by Project Lead the Way  The 4-year program consists of these courses: Year 1 – Introduction to Engineering Design, Year 2 – Principles of Engineering, Year 3 – Civil Engineering & Architecture, and Year 4 – Engineering Design & Development.

Clubs
West Campus has more than thirty clubs and organizations. Among these are Body Improvement Club, Christ Kidz, Debate Club, Girls Who Code, Key Club, Well-Bean Club, Interact, Chinese Culture Club, Folklorico Club, California Scholarship Federation, Mathletes, Mental Health Club, National Honor Society club, Quiz Bowl Club, WC Beautification Club, Fashion Club, Music Creation Club, Gender and Sexuality Alliance (GSA),  HOSA, Symphony Club, Green Team, Radio Club, MESA  and many others that allows students to spend some times with activities that interest them, whether new or old. The prominent community service club, NHS, National Honors Society, offers students the chance of helping out in communities and improve multiple college admirable qualities. This worldwide organization founds its way into the small community of West Campus, and has allowed its students a way of achieving greatness in areas of leadership, character and service.
One major student organization includes Associated Student Body (ASB) where a group of elected students work together to create a better community at West Campus by leading a variety of events such as rallies and dances. There are 4 elected representative for each class, such as, President, Vice President, Senator, and Secretary. In addition, there are other officials, who represent the entire student body, for example, Rally Heads, Publicist, Treasurers, etc. .

Sports 
There are a total of 18 sports that take place over the seasons of Fall, Winter, and Spring. A few sports at West Campus include cheer, golf, soccer, basketball, cross country, track, baseball, softball, volleyball, wrestling, swim, and tennis. The high school has four soccer teams, four basketball teams, two baseball teams, two softball teams, two golf teams (men's and women's)  and several volleyball teams. During the COVID-19 pandemic, practices were limited to voluntary outside conditioning.

Music
The West Campus music department consists of a music appreciation program, a marching band, a drumline, and color guard. These groups are affiliated with the Northern California Band Association.

Admission 
Enrollment is via application, including an essay, a mathematics session, and transcripts of grades 7 and 8 marks. When the number of acceptable applicants exceeds the number of available spaces, students are chosen via lottery.

The Foundation for Excellence 
The West Campus Foundation for Excellence (WCFE) is the school's parent-teacher organization that helps to provide for and improve the student community. They raise funds which go towards Moot Court, Yearbook, Drama, Band, athletics, college tours, classroom texts, and scholarships. They also coordinate with the Academic Student Body (ASB) with events such as staff appreciation lunch and senior breakfast. The organization requires both an application and a fee to join  and organizes their members in the following tiers with different benefits: Bronze (US$25.00), Silver (US$50.00), Gold (US$100.00), and Platinum (US$150.00).

West Campus Foundation for Excellence also participates in community building activities like Back to School BBQ, staff appreciation lunch and many more.

Notable alumni
 Ryan Guzman, actor (graduated 2005).
 Steven Silva, actor (graduated 2004).

COVID-19 response
West Campus High School and other schools within the Sacramento City Unified School District shut down in-person classes as of March 2020, and adopted distance learning through Zoom, a video communications application.

References

External links
West Campus High web page

Educational institutions established in 2002
High schools in Sacramento, California
Public high schools in California
Magnet schools in California
2002 establishments in California